Fabio Vitaioli (born 5 April 1984) is a San Marinese footballer who currently plays for Murata and the San Marino national football team. Alongside playing football, Vitaioli also holds a day job as a bar owner.

International career
Vitaioli made his senior international debut on 2 June 2007 in a 6–0 defeat to Germany in Euro 2008 qualifying.

References

External links

1984 births
Drinking establishment owners
Living people
Sammarinese footballers
San Marino international footballers
S.S. Murata players
Campionato Sammarinese di Calcio players

Association football defenders